John Cass (1661–1718) was a British merchant and politician.

Sir John Cass may also refer to:

 Sir John Cass's Foundation, an education charity in London
 Cass Business School, the former name of The Business School at City, University of London
 Sir John Cass (19th century), merchant and father of Annie Pearson, Viscountess Cowdray

See also
John Kass, American columnist